Ghuri (also Romanized as Ghūrī and Ghowrī; also known as Qūrī) is a village in Deh Chah Rural District, Poshtkuh District, Neyriz County, Fars Province, Iran. At the 2006 census, its population was 1,095, in 299 families.

References 

Populated places in Neyriz County